ValueJet is a private Nigerian airline with its head office in Lagos State which provides scheduled passenger services to various cities of Nigeria.

History
The airline commenced operations on October 10, 2022 , with  flights to Abuja, Port Harcourt, Asaba and Jos. The Airline was founded in 2018 by Kunle Soname, the Chairman of the sports betting website Bet9ja and owner of Portuguese football club C.D. Feirense

Destinations
As of January 2023, ValueJet flies to the following destinations in Nigeria.

Fleet
As of January 2023, ValueJet has the following fleet.

See also
 Ibom Air
 Air Peace
 Arik Air
 Dana Air
 Aero Contractors (Nigeria)

References 

Airlines